Fucellia is a genus of seaweed flies in the family Anthomyiidae. There are at least 20 described species in Fucellia.

Species
These 28 species belong to the genus Fucellia:

F. aestuum Aldrich, 1918 i c g
F. albeola Huckett, 1927 i c g
F. antennata Stein, 1910 i c g
F. apicalis Kertész, 1908 c g
F. ariciiformis (Holmgren, 1872) i c g
F. assimilis Malloch, 1918 i c g
F. biseriata Huckett, 1966 i c g
F. boninensis Snyder, 1965 c g
F. calcoerata (Macquart, 1851) c g
F. capensis (Schiner, 1868) c g
F. chinensis Kertész, 1908 i c g b
F. costalis Stein, 1910 i c g b
F. fucorum (Fallén, 1819) i c g
F. griseola (Fallén, 1819) c g
F. hypopygialis Ringdahl, 1930 c g
F. intermedia (Zetterstedt, 1845) c g
F. kamtchatica Ringdahl, 1930 i c g
Fucellia maritima (Haliday, 1838)
F. pictipennis Becker, 1907 i c g
F. pluralis Huckett, 1965 i c g
F. rejecta Aldrich, 1918 i c g
F. rufitibia Stein, 1910 i c g
F. separata Stein, 1910 i c g
F. signata (Zetterstedt, 1845) c g
F. syuitimorii (Séguy, 1936) c g
F. tergina (Zetterstedt, 1845) i c g
F. thinobia (Thomson, 1869) i c g
F. vibei Collin, 1951 i c g

Data sources: i = ITIS, c = Catalogue of Life, g = GBIF, b = Bugguide.net

References

Further reading

External links

 

Anthomyiidae
Articles created by Qbugbot
Schizophora genera